Defence of the Realm is a 1986 British political thriller film directed by David Drury, starring Gabriel Byrne, Greta Scacchi, and Denholm Elliott, with Robbie Coltrane in a supporting role.

The film takes its title from the Defence of the Realm Act 1914, passed in the United Kingdom at the start of the First World War, which  gave the government wide-ranging powers during the war.

It was shot at Shepperton Studios and on location in London and Duxford in Cambridgeshire. The film's sets were designed by the art director Roger Murray-Leach. The film was distributed in the United Kingdom by the Rank Organisation, one of the last films to be released by the company.

The plot mirrors the real-life British spy scandal known as the Profumo affair.

Plot
On a foggy night a car containing two men is pursued by police. The radio is discussing the country being on high alert due to a terrorist attack in Ankara. Going down a dead end one (Steven) escapes over a high barbed wire fence but the other one is caught.

Dennis Markham (Ian Bannen), a prominent Member of Parliament is reported by a London paper to have been seen leaving a woman's home on the same evening as she is visited by a military attaché from East Germany, Markham's loyalty to his country is questioned. The media men debate whether or not to print the story.

Bayliss, Mullen and MacLeod all work together for the Daily Dispatch. Bayliss is sent for a private meeting with Markham and explains the link to the German agent (which Markham is unaware of). Meanwhile Mullen goes to interview Nina, Markham's pretty secretary, and then speaks to Markham's wife (initially pretending to be a policeman).

The story breaks as the "Markham Affair" on television and throughout the newspapers.

Markham is hounded by the media and forced to resign.

The author of the newspaper exposé, Nick Mullen (Gabriel Byrne), continues his work alongside colleague Vernon Bayliss (Denholm Elliott) who suspects that Markham was framed. When Bayliss dies from a supposed heart attack the same night as Bayliss' flat is ransacked by someone who was not after money or valuables, Mullen suspects something deeper at work. He breaks into Bayliss's desk and finds press-cuttings and a tape which insinuate a different motive behind the attack on Markham.

Mullen visits the young man in prison (caught by police at the start of the film) telling him that his accomplice is dead. This leads him to go to the site where the film began a high security but seemingly unmanned military base run by the USAF near the village of Brandon. Mullen realises that the USAF presence in the UK involves a nuclear weapon capability and Markham seems linked to aims to rid the UK of such. This may have been the motive to start a mudslinging campaign.

With the help of Markham's secretary, Nina Beckman (Greta Scacchi), Mullen continues to investigate the affair despite a break-in at his flat, surveillance and other attempts to stop him.

When he goes to publish the story his editor calls him in to say it is a great story but they cannot publish due to the Official Secrets Act. Moreover, the newspaper owner Kingsbrook (a character akin to Lord Beaverbrook) has personally intervened to make sure it isn't published. But how did he know it existed?

Mullen discovers the "KGB agent" was actually a British agent so asks the editor where they got the source that said he was KGB. He gives up the name Anthony Clegg. But when he confronts Clegg in a gentleman's club he is grabbed by two henchmen and driven to an office for questioning by senior ministers. Without explanation he is then left alone in an industrial building. He returns to his ransacked flat. Nina arrives at the door but as she steps in a bomb goes off.

However, she had posted the incriminating evidence to Germany and the story of the near-nuclear-disaster spreads across the globe through the European press.

Cast
 Gabriel Byrne as Nicholas "Nick" Mullen
 Greta Scacchi as Nina Beckman
 Denholm Elliott as Vernon Bayliss
 Ian Bannen as Dennis Markham
 Fulton Mackay as Victor Kingsbrook
 Bill Paterson as Jack Macleod
 David Calder as Harry Champion
 Frederick Treves as Arnold Reece
 Robbie Coltrane as Leo McAskey
 Annabel Leventon as Trudy Markham 
 Graham Fletcher-Cook as Micky Parker
 Danny Webb as Danny Royce (photographer)
 Prentis Hancock as Frank Longman 
 Mark Tandy as Philip Henderson 
 Oliver Ford Davies as Anthony Clegg 
 George Ellis Jones as D.C.S. Catterick 
 Lyndon Brook as Pugh
 Philip Whitchurch as Cuttings Librarian
 Laurance Rudic as Charlie
 James Fleet as Clegg's assistant in the Ministry

Reception
Halliwell's Film Guide described it as an "efficient political melodrama, basically too old-fashioned to start a cult". Denholm Elliott's performance has been singled out for particular praise. Roger Ebert wrote, "The acting is strong throughout, but Elliott is especially effective. What is it about this actor, who has been in so many different kinds of movies and seems to make each role special? Here he is needed to suggest integrity and scruples, and does it almost simply by the way he looks... Defence of the Realm ends on a bleak and cynical note – unless you count the somewhat contrived epilogue – and gets there with intelligence and a sharp, bitter edge." Radio Times gives the film four stars out of five, claiming, "The role of the sozzled veteran reporter who for once finds himself involved in a meaningful story is brought wonderfully to life by Denholm Elliott... Gabriel Byrne, as Elliott's ambitious young colleague, is less effective, but the film has plenty of tension and co-star Greta Scacchi proves a worthy accomplice."

Awards
 Denholm Elliott won a BAFTA for best supporting actor.

References

External links
 
 
 

1980s political thriller films
1986 films
British political thriller films
Films set in London
Films shot in London
Films shot at Shepperton Studios
Films scored by Richard Harvey
Films directed by David Drury
1980s English-language films
1980s British films